Pentactina is a genus of flowering plants belonging to the family Rosaceae.

Species
Its native range is Korea.

Species:
 Pentactina rupicola Nakai

References

Rosaceae
Rosaceae genera